Carolyne Gomes de Souza Mazzo (born March 23, 1997 in São Paulo) is a Brazilian swimmer.

References

Brazilian female breaststroke swimmers
Living people
1997 births
Swimmers from São Paulo
20th-century Brazilian women
21st-century Brazilian women